Branded may refer to:

 Branded (1920 film), a 1920 British silent drama film
 Branded (1931 film), a 1931 Western film 
 Branded (1950 film), a 1950 Western film 
 Branded (2012 film), a 2012 science fiction film 
 Branded (Bonfire album), 2011
 Branded (Isaac Hayes album), 1995
 "Branded" (Dad's Army), a 1969 episode of the British comedy series Dad's Army
 Branded (TV series), an American Western TV series that aired in 1965 and 1966
Branded, a newsletter published by Check My Ads
"Branded", a song by Lita Ford from the album Living Like a Runaway, 2012

See also
 Branding (disambiguation)